Dileep Manubhai Jhaveri is a Gujarati language poet, translator, playwright, editor and physician from Mumbai, India.

Biography 
Jhaveri was born on 3 April 1943 in Mumbai, India to Manubhai Jhaveri. He serves on the editorial board of Kobita Review, a Kolkata-based bilingual (Bengali and English) journal, and is Muse India'''s contributing editor for Gujarati language.

 Works 
Jhaveri published a collection of Gujarati poetry entitled Pandukavyo ane Itar in 1989, followed by Khandit Kand ane Pachhi (2014) and Kavita Vishe Kavita (2017). Vyasochchvas (2003) is a play written by him, which was translated into English as A Breath of Vyas by Kamal Sanyal. Many of his poems have been anthologised and translated into English, Hindi, Marathi, Malayalam, Bengali, Korean, Chinese, Japanese and Irish. He has edited an anthology of contemporary Gujarati poetry in English translation titled Breath Becoming a Word''. The poet Gabriel Rosenstock has translated his works into Irish.

Recognition 
Jhaveri received the Critics Award in 1989, the Jayant Pathak Poetry Award in 1989 and the Gujarati Sahitya Parishad award in 1990. He was invited to the Asian Poets Conference in Korea in 1986 and Taiwan in 1995.

References

External links 
 

1943 births
Gujarati-language writers
Living people
Writers from Mumbai
Poets from Maharashtra
Medical doctors from Mumbai
Indian male poets
20th-century Indian poets
Indian magazine editors
20th-century Indian translators
20th-century Indian male writers